A Greater Darkness is the eighth release by extreme industrial metal band Red Harvest. It was released on 20 February 2007. The album was nominated in 2007 for a Spellemann Award in the "Metal" category.

Track listing
All Songs Written By Red Harvest.
 Antidote – 5:50
 Hole in Me – 6:20
 Dead Cities – 3:42
 Mouth of Madness – 5:04
 Beyond the Limits of Physical Xperience – 3:28
 Icons of Fear... The Curse of the Universe – 4:01
 I Sweat W.O.M.D. – 4:51
 WarThemes – 4:28
 Distorted Eyes – 10:37
 Proprioception – 2:52

Personnel
Ofu Khan: Vocals, Guitars, Syntheiszers, Sampler
TurboNatas: Guitars, Synthesizer
Lrz: Keyboards, Synthesizers, Sampler
Thomas B: Bass
E_Wroldsen: Drums, Percussion

Production
Arranged, Produced, Recorded & Engineered By Red Harvest
Co-Produced By Asgeir Mickelson
Mixed By Borge Finstad
Mastered By Audun Strype

References

External links
Red Harvest's official website
"A Greater Darkness" at discogs

2007 albums
Red Harvest (band) albums
Season of Mist albums